14 Andromedae, abbreviated 14 And, also named Veritate , is a single, orange-hued giant star situated approximately 247 light-years away in the northern constellation of Andromeda. It is dimly visible to the naked eye with an apparent visual magnitude of 5.22. The star is moving closer to the Earth with a heliocentric radial velocity of −60 km/s. In 2008 an extrasolar planet (designated 14 Andromedae b, later named Spe) was discovered to be orbiting the star.

This is a red clump giant with a stellar classification of K0 III, indicating it is on the horizontal branch and is generating energy through helium fusion at its core. The star has 1.12 (or 2.2) times the mass of the Sun and has expanded to 10.5 times the Sun's radius. It is radiating 60.3 times the Sun's luminosity from its enlarged photosphere at an effective temperature of 4,743 K. It is thought it was formerly an A- or F-type main-sequence star earlier in its life, prior to evolving into a giant.

Nomenclature 

14 Andromedae is the star's Flamsteed designation. Following its discovery the planet was designated 14 Andromedae b.

In July 2014 the International Astronomical Union launched NameExoWorlds, a process for giving proper names to certain exoplanets and their host stars. The process involved public nomination and voting for the new names. In December 2015, the IAU announced the winning names were Veritate for this star and Spe for its planet.

The winning names were based on those submitted by the Thunder Bay Centre of the Royal Astronomical Society of Canada); namely 'Veritas' and 'Spes', Latin for 'truth' and 'hope', respectively. (Veritas was also the Roman goddess of truth and Spes was the Roman goddess of hope.) The IAU substituted the ablative forms 'Veritate' and 'Spe', which mean 'where there is truth' and 'where there is hope', respectively. This was because 'Veritas' is the name of an asteroid important for the study of the solar system.

In 2016, the IAU organized a Working Group on Star Names (WGSN) to catalog and standardize proper names for stars. In its first bulletin of July 2016, the WGSN explicitly recognized the names of exoplanets and their host stars approved by the Executive Committee Working Group Public Naming of Planets and Planetary Satellites, including the names of stars adopted during the 2015 NameExoWorlds campaign. This star is now so entered in the IAU Catalog of Star Names.

Planetary system 

In 2008, a planet was announced to be orbiting the star.  The planet was found to have a minimum mass of 4.8 Jupiter masses and to be orbiting in a circular orbit that takes 186 days to complete.  The planet is one of the few known planets to be orbiting an evolved intermediate-mass star and one of the innermost (such planets have only been discovered around clump giants).

See also 
 6 Lyncis
 81 Ceti
 HD 167042
 Upsilon Andromedae

References

External links
 

K-type giants
Horizontal-branch stars
Planetary systems with one confirmed planet

Andromeda (constellation)
Durchmusterung objects
Andromedae, 14
221345
116076
8930